Millville is a borough in Columbia County, Pennsylvania, United States. It is part of Northeastern Pennsylvania. As of the 2020 census it had a population of 976.It is part of the Bloomsburg-Berwick micropolitan area.

History

John Eves, a native of Ireland living in Mill Creek Hundred, Delaware, is thought to have been one of the men to visit the Greenwood Valley and Little Fishing Creek area in 1770. (One account of this visit indicates that he purchased a sizable portion of the land he explored in the area from the Indians who had served as his guides on his journey.) Although he returned to Delaware after this initial visit, he returned the following year with his son Thomas and built a log cabin on the property. The entire Eves family arrived the next year, in 1772, and began tilling the fields adjacent to the cabin as soon as they could be cleared.

In 1774, the Eves family received a deed for their  property in the valley, the largest land holding at the time in what would later become Columbia County. Title for the land, originally obtained by William and Elizabeth McMean in 1769, was passed to Reuben Haines, and then to John Eves.

An Indian uprising, the Battle of Wyoming, in mid-summer of 1778, caused the Eves family to flee their home in the valley and take refuge at a stockade near Washingtonville. Upon their return in 1785, they found their cabin burned and their fields overgrown, but immediately set about to recreate their homestead.

When the Eves family returned in the mid-1780s, they were determined to make the settlement permanent. They were accompanied or were soon followed by several other families, including Masters, Kisner, Battin, Parker, Lundy, Lemon, Oliver, and Rich. With 17 children and 104 grandchildren, John Eves looked after the building of homes for the family, a gristmill that was to stand for 100 years, and later a sawmill and several other essential structures.

Growth of the community was slow because it was not located along a main traveled route or major waterway. Until 1798, Indian trails, which crossed at Millville, were the only accessways to the area. In that year, a road was surveyed across the Mount Pleasant hills to the Susquehanna River. It was 1856 through before the road from Bloomsburg to Laporte was laid out through Millville.

Early residents were almost entirely self-sufficient. Thomas Eves succeeded his father in ownership of the grist mill and built the first house in what is now Millville Borough. According to an early historian, David and Andrew Eves opened the first store in the area in 1827. David Eves was also commissioned the first postmaster in 1831, followed by his brother Andrew some years later.

While the early population was scattered, provision was made for both worship and education. In the early years of the community, services and classes were held in the homes, but in 1785, a school was started in Millville and a two-room meeting house was erected in 1795.

Local industry at the time consisted of those operations which were necessary to meet the needs of the early population. Sawmills and grist mills were the first, followed by a woolen mill, started in 1813 by John Watson, several brick plants, and a wagon shop, established by Charles Eves, in 1837.

One spurt of growth in Millville occurred in 1856 when the road from Bloomsburg to Laporte was constructed. The town experienced considerable growth in the years following construction of this roadway because the community now had adequate access to markets and other transportation links in Bloomsburg. A second period of growth was experienced in 1887 when the railroad was constructed through town. Numerous businesses and industries were created and buildings were erected to service the railroad. A local newspaper, the Weekly Tablet, published its first edition in April 1887.

Geography
Millville is located in northwestern Columbia County at  (41.122785, -76.527650), on the east side of Little Fishing Creek, which flows south to join Fishing Creek just north of the Susquehanna River in Bloomsburg. Millville is bordered to the north, east, and south by Greenwood Township, to the southwest, across Little Fishing Creek, by Madison Township, and to the northwest, also across the creek, by Pine Township. The unincorporated community of Iola borders Millville to the north in Greenwood Township.

Millville is served by Pennsylvania Route 42 and Pennsylvania Route 254. PA 42 leads north  (via US 220) to Laporte and south  to Bloomsburg, the Columbia County seat, while PA 254 leads east  to Rohrsburg and southwest  to Jerseytown.

Demographics

As of the census of 2000, there were 991 people, 380 households, and 242 families residing in the borough. The population density was 1,039.7 people per square mile (402.8/km²). There were 408 housing units at an average density of 428.0 per square mile (165.8/km²). The racial makeup of the borough was 98.89% White, 0.20% African American, 0.61% Asian, and 0.30% from two or more races. Hispanic or Latino of any race were 0.30% of the population.

There were 380 households, out of which 27.4% had children under the age of 18 living with them, 50.5% were married couples living together, 10.8% had a female householder with no husband present, and 36.3% were non-families. 31.8% of all households were made up of individuals, and 20.0% had someone living alone who was 65 years of age or older. The average household size was 2.25 and the average family size was 2.83.

In the borough the population was spread out, with 19.2% under the age of 18, 7.4% from 18 to 24, 24.0% from 25 to 44, 19.8% from 45 to 64, and 29.7% who were 65 years of age or older. The median age was 44 years. For every 100 females, there were 72.9 males. For every 100 females age 18 and over, there were 69.7 males.

The median income for a household in the borough was $29,191, and the median income for a family was $44,063. Males had a median income of $30,357 versus $23,269 for females. The per capita income for the borough was $18,958. About 10.4% of families and 14.0% of the population were below the poverty line, including 15.8% of those under age 18 and 20.9% of those age 65 or over.

References

External links
 Millville Borough official website

Populated places established in 1770
Bloomsburg–Berwick metropolitan area
Boroughs in Columbia County, Pennsylvania
1772 establishments in Pennsylvania